The Daihatsu EV1 was a concept car designed by Daihatsu as an electric test vehicle and first unveiled at the 1973 Tokyo Motor Show. Only one unit was built.

Specifications 
The EV1 uses two  electric motors, which is rear-mounted and driving the rear axle, and powered by a  battery which are contained in a removable tray for easier charging.

References 

EV1
Rear-wheel-drive vehicles
Electric concept cars